In medicine and medical anthropology, a culture-bound syndrome, culture-specific syndrome, or folk illness is a combination of psychiatric and somatic symptoms that are considered to be a recognizable disease only within a specific society or culture. There are no objective biochemical or structural alterations of body organs or functions, and the disease is not recognized in other cultures. The term culture-bound syndrome was included in the fourth version of the Diagnostic and Statistical Manual of Mental Disorders (American Psychiatric Association, 1994) which also includes a list of the most common culture-bound conditions (DSM-IV: Appendix I). Counterpart within the framework of ICD-10 (Chapter V) are the culture-specific disorders defined in Annex 2 of the Diagnostic criteria for research.

More broadly, an endemic that can be attributed to certain behavior patterns within a specific culture by suggestion may be referred to as a potential behavioral epidemic. As in the cases of drug use, or alcohol and smoking abuses, transmission can be determined by communal reinforcement and person-to-person interactions. On etiological grounds, it can be difficult to distinguish the causal contribution of culture upon disease from other environmental factors such as toxicity.

Identification
A culture-specific syndrome is characterized by:
 categorization as a disease in the culture (i.e., not a voluntary behaviour or false claim);
 widespread familiarity in the culture;
 complete lack of familiarity or misunderstanding of the condition to people in other cultures;
 no objectively demonstrable biochemical or tissue abnormalities (signs);
 the condition is usually recognized and treated by the folk medicine of the culture.

Some culture-specific syndromes involve somatic symptoms (pain or disturbed function of a body part), while others are purely behavioral. Some culture-bound syndromes appear with similar features in several cultures, but with locally specific traits, such as penis panics.

A culture-specific syndrome is not the same as a geographically localized disease with specific, identifiable, causal tissue abnormalities, such as kuru or sleeping sickness, or genetic conditions limited to certain populations. It is possible that a condition originally assumed to be a culture-bound behavioral syndrome is found to have a biological cause; from a medical perspective it would then be redefined into another nosological category.

Medical perspectives
The American Psychiatric Association states the following:

The term culture-bound syndrome is controversial since it reflects the different opinions of anthropologists and psychiatrists. Anthropologists have a tendency to emphasize the relativistic and culture-specific dimensions of the syndromes, while physicians tend to emphasize the universal and neuropsychological dimensions. Guarnaccia & Rogler (1999) have argued in favor of investigating culture-bound syndromes on their own terms, and believe that the syndromes have enough cultural integrity to be treated as independent objects of research.

Guarnaccia and Rogler demonstrate the issues that occur when diagnosing cultural bound disorders using the DSM-IV. One of the key problems that arise is the "subsumption of culture bound syndromes into psychiatric categories", which ultimately creates a medical hegemony and places the western perspective above that of other cultural and epistemological explanations of disease. The urgency for further investigation or reconsideration of the DSM-IV's authoritative power is emphasized, as the DSM becomes an international document for research and medical systems abroad. Guarnaccia and Rogler provide two research questions that must be considered, "firstly, how much do we know about the culture-bound syndromes for us to be able to fit them into standard classification; and secondly, whether such a standard and exhaustive classification in fact exists".

It is suggested that the problematic nature of the DSM becomes evident when we view it as definitively conclusive. Questions are raised to whether culture-bound syndromes can be treated as discrete entities, or whether their symptoms are generalized and perceived as an amalgamation of previously diagnosed illnesses. If this is the case, then the DSM may be what Bruno Latour would defined as "particular universalism". In that the Western medical system views itself to have a privileged insight into the true intelligence of nature, in contrast to the model provided by other cultural perspectives.

Some studies suggest that culture-bound syndromes represent an acceptable way within a specific culture (and cultural context) among certain vulnerable individuals (i.e. an ataque de nervios at a funeral in Puerto Rico) to express distress in the wake of a traumatic experience. A similar manifestation of distress when displaced into a North American medical culture may lead to a very different, even adverse outcome for a given individual and his or her family. The history and etymology of some syndromes such as Brain-Fog Syndrome, have also been reattributed to 19th century Victorian Britain rather than West Africa.

In 2013, the DSM 5, dropped the term culture-bound syndrome, preferring the new name "Cultural Concepts of Distress".

Cultural collusion between medical perspectives 
Within the traditional Hmong culture, epilepsy (qaug dab peg) directly translates to "the spirit catches you and you fall down" which is said to be an evil spirit called a dab that captures your soul and makes you ill. In this culture, individuals with seizures are seen to be blessed with a gift; an access point into the spiritual realm which no one else has been given. In westernised society, epilepsy is considered a serious long-term brain condition, that can have a major impairment on an individual's life. The way the illness is dealt with in Hmong culture is vastly different due to the high-status epilepsy has amongst the culture, compared to individuals who have the condition in westernised societies. Individuals with epilepsy within the Hmong culture are a source of pride for their family.

Another culture bound illness is neurasthenia which is a vaguely described medical ailment in Chinese culture that presents as lassitude, weariness, headaches, and irritability and is mostly linked to emotional disturbance. A report done in 1942 showed that 87% of patients diagnosed by Chinese psychiatrists as having neurasthenia could be reclassified as having major depression according to the DSM-3 criteria. Another study conducted in Hong Kong showed that most patients selectively presented their symptoms according to what they perceived as appropriate and tended to only focus on somatic suffering, rather than the emotional problems they were facing.

Globalisation 
Globalisation is a process whereby information, cultures, jobs, goods, and services are spread across national borders. This has had a powerful impact on the 21st century in many ways including through enriching cultural awareness across the globe. Greater level of cultural integration is occurring due to rapid industrialisation and globalisation, with cultures absorbing more influences from each other. As cultural awareness begins to increase between countries, there is a consideration into whether cultural bound syndromes will slowly lose their geographically bound nature and become commonly known syndromes that will then become internationally recognised. Anthropologist and psychiatrist Roland Littlewood makes the observation that these diseases are likely to vanish in an increasingly homogenous global culture in the face of globalisation (and industrialisation). Depression for example, was once only accepted in western societies, however it is now recognised as a mental disorder in all parts of the world. In contrast to Eastern civilizations such as Taiwan, depression is still much more common in Western cultures like the United States. This could indicate that globalisation may have an impact on allowing disorders to be spread across borders, however these disorders may remain predominant in certain cultures.

DSM-IV-TR list
The fourth edition of Diagnostic and Statistical Manual of Mental Disorders classifies the below syndromes as culture-bound syndromes:

DSM-5 list 
The fifth edition of Diagnostic and Statistical Manual of Mental Disorders classifies the below syndromes as cultural concepts of distress, a closely related concept:

ICD-10 list 
The 10th revision of the International Statistical Classification of Diseases and Related Health Problems (ICD) classifies the below syndromes as culture-specific disorders:

Other examples
Though "the ethnocentric bias of Euro-American psychiatrists has led to the idea that culture-bound syndromes are confined to non-Western cultures", a prominent example of a Western culture-bound syndrome is anorexia nervosa.

Within the contiguous United States,  the consumption of kaolin, a type of clay, has been proposed as a culture-bound syndrome observed in African Americans in the rural south, particularly in areas in which the mining of kaolin is common.

In South Africa, among the Xhosa people, the syndrome of amafufunyana is commonly used to describe those believed to be possessed by demons or other malevolent spirits. Traditional healers in the culture usually perform exorcisms in order to drive off these spirits. Upon investigating the phenomenon, researchers found that many of the people claimed to be affected by the syndrome exhibited the traits and characteristics of schizophrenia.

Some researchers have suggested that both premenstrual syndrome (PMS) and the more severe premenstrual dysphoric disorder (PMDD), which have currently unknown physical mechanisms, are Western culture-bound syndromes.  However, this is controversial.

Tarantism is an expression of mass psychogenic illness documented in Southern Italy since the 11th century.

Morgellons is a rare self-diagnosed skin condition reported primarily in white populations in the United States. It has been described by a journalist  as "a socially transmitted disease over the Internet".

Vegetative-vascular dystonia can be considered an example of somatic condition formally recognised by local medical communities in former Soviet Union countries, but not in Western classification systems. Its umbrella term nature as neurological condition also results in diagnosing neurotic patients as neurological ones, in effect substituting possible psychiatric stigma with culture-bound syndrome disguised as a neurological condition.

Refugee children in Sweden have been known to fall into coma-like states on learning their families will be deported. In a 130-page report on the condition commissioned by the government and published in 2006, a team of psychologists, political scientists, and sociologists hypothesized that it was a culture-bound syndrome.

A startle disorder similar to latah, called  (sometimes spelled imu:), is found among Ainu people, both Sakhalin Ainu and Hokkaido Ainu.

A condition similar to piblokto, called  (sometimes meryachenie), is found among Yakuts, Yukaghirs, and Evenks living in Siberia.

The trance-like violent behavior of the Viking age berserkers – behavior that disappeared with the arrival of Christianity – has been described as a culture-bound syndrome.

See also

 Cross-cultural psychiatry
 Cross-cultural psychology
 Cultural competence in healthcare
 Mass psychogenic illness
 Hikikomori
 Hi-wa itck
 Medical anthropology
 Neurasthenia
 Zen sickness

References

Further reading
 
 

  Paperback 
  (Note: Different preview pages result in the full chapter being viewable from the title link).

External links 
 Psychiatric Times – Introduction to Culture-Bound Syndromes
 Skeptical Inquirer – Culture-bound syndromes as fakery

 
Medical anthropology